is a Japanese badminton player who affiliate with Saishunkan team.

Achievements

BWF International Challenge/Series (2 titles, 2 runners-up) 
Women's singles

Women's doubles

  BWF International Challenge tournament
  BWF International Series tournament

References

External links 
 

Living people
1996 births
People from Nerima
Japanese female badminton players
21st-century Japanese women